Mohan Magan Patel (born 11 November 1952 in Auckland) is a former field hockey player from New Zealand, who was a member of the national team that won the gold medal at the 1976 Summer Olympics in Montreal, Quebec, Canada.

Mohan Patel was inducted into the New Zealand Sports Hall of Fame in 1990. He was a deputy principal at Mangere College, retiring in December 2016.

References

External links
 

New Zealand male field hockey players
Olympic field hockey players of New Zealand
Field hockey players at the 1976 Summer Olympics
Field hockey players from Auckland
1952 births
Living people
New Zealand sportspeople of Indian descent
Olympic medalists in field hockey
Medalists at the 1976 Summer Olympics
Olympic gold medalists for New Zealand